The 2008 Mnet KM Music Festival (MKMF) was the tenth of the annual music awards in Seoul, South Korea that took place on November 15, 2008, at the Seoul Sports Complex.

Leading the nominees were boy groups TVXQ and Epik High, and girl group Wonder Girls with 5 nominations each. By the end of the ceremony, Wonder Girls won the most wins and became the first artist/performer to receive 3 wins, which included one daesang award. It was followed by Big Bang and Lee Hyori with 2 each.

Background
The award ceremony was held for the tenth consecutive time, which was held at the Seoul Olympic Stadium for the second time. For the first time, however, singer-actor Rain was the only one to host the event. The official slogan used was "My Dream, My Music, My Way, My MKMF".

Before revealing the Best New Male Artist winner, an intermission number from the boy group nominees was performed, resembling the performance by the then new girl group nominees during the ninth ceremony held last year. Together with ex-H.O.T. member Moon Hee-joon, the boy groups performed the debut singles of the past Best New Group winners including Super Junior, SS501, TVXQ, g.o.d, and Shinhwa.

During its 10th anniversary, Clon made an appearance once again to say a little speech during their experiences. Additionally, the first on screen kiss between Lee Hyori and T.O.P happened during their performance that their skit made headlines later on.

Performers
The following individuals and groups, listed in order of appearance, performed musical numbers at the ceremony.

Winners and nominees

Winners are listed first and highlighted in boldface.

Special awards
 Auction Netizen Popularity Award – TVXQ – "Mirotic"
 Hallyu Singers by the Japanese Press – SG Wannabe
 Mnet PD's Choice Award – Shin Seung-hun
 MKMF 10th Anniversary Commemorative – H.O.T. (received by Moon Hee-joon)
 Overseas Viewers' Award – TVXQ – "Mirotic"
 Best New Asian Artist – Khalil Fong
 Composer Award: Kim Jong-wan – "Time to walk memories" (기억을 걷는 시간) ( Nell )
  Lyricist Award: Kim Dong-ryul – "Let's Start Again"
 Arrangement Award: Tablo – "One"
 Music Portal Mnet Award: Big Bang

Multiple awards

Artist(s) with multiple wins
The following artist(s) received two or more wins (excluding the special awards):

Artist(s) with multiple nominations
The following artist(s) received more than two nominations:

Presenters

 Rain – Main host of the show
 Shin Dong-wook and Yoon Ji-min – Presenters of the award for Best New Female Artist
 Ryu Deok-hwan and Wonder Girls – Presenters of the award for Best New Male Artist
 Baek Ji-young and Byeon Jin-seob (변진섭) – Presenters of the award for Best Ballad/R&B Award
 박주만 and Jae Young-jeon (전재영) – Presenters of the award for Auction Netizen Popularity Award
 Kim Hyun-soo (김현수) and Hong Soo-ah (홍수아) – Presenters of the award for Best Dance Performance
 Ahn Hye-Kyung and Sung Chun Hwang (황성철) – Presenters of the award for Best OST
 정민실 (Japan Radio DJ) – Presenter of the special award for Hallyu Singers by the Japanese Press
 Kim Shin-young – Presenter of the award for Best House & Electronic
 Leessang and Hong Seo-beom (홍서범) – Presenters of the award for Best Hip Hop Performance
 Heocham (허참) and Joo – Presenters of the award for Best Rock Performance
 Lee Jin-wook and Yoon So-yi – Presenters of the award for Best Male Artist
 Jeon Hye-bin and Tae Jin-ah – Presenters of the award for Best Female Artist
 Shinee – Handed in the award for 10th Year Anniversary Remember Award
 Sean (션) and his son No Harang (노하랑) – Introduced the next performers (My MKMF #5)
 Go Eun-ah and Lee Wan – Go Eun-ah and Lee Wan
 Yoon So-yi, Chae Yeon, and 주이 – Presenters of the award for Best New Asian Artist
 Park Tae-hwan – Presenter of the award for Best Female Group
 Yoon Jin-seo and Lee Chun-hee – Presenters of the award for Best Male Group
 (Lee Gisang (이기상) and Choe Halli (최할리)) Jin-hie Park and Lee Ki-woo – Presenters of the award for Best Music Video
 Bom Yeoreum Gaeul Kyeoul – Presenters of the award for Song of the Year
 Shin Seung-hun – Presenter of the award for Artist of the Year
 Kim Chang-wan – Presenter of the award for Album of the Year

References

External links
 Mnet Asian Music Awards  official website

MAMA Awards ceremonies
Mnet Km Music Festival
Mnet Km Music Festival
Mnet Km Music Festival